Sergei M. Plekhanov (Сергей Плеханов, born May 7, 1946, in Moscow) is associate professor of Political Science at York University in Toronto, Ontario, Canada and a former deputy director of the Institute for US and Canadian Studies in Russia.

Education and career
Plekhanov received a B.A. and an M.A. in International Relations from the Moscow State Institute of International Relations and a Ph.D. in history from the Institute for the Study of the US and Canada of the Soviet Academy of Sciences. From 1988 to 1993, he was the deputy director of the Institute for the Study of the US and Canada. From 1985 to 1990, Dr. Plekhanov participated in the development of reform policies of Mikhail Gorbachev and took part in Russia's democratic movement. Since 1992, he has taught as a visiting professor at the University of California, Irvine, and Occidental College in (Los Angeles). His areas of interest include Russian politics and foreign policy, history of Russian communism, problems of post-communism, US-Russian relations, and the local, regional, and global aspects of the crisis in Afghanistan.  He is writing a book on US-Russian relations.

From 1989 to 1991, Dr. Plekhanov served as Soviet Affairs Consultant with CBS News, and from 1991 to 1992, he was a consultant for the production of the HBO television film Stalin in which he wrote the Russian subtitles, starring Robert Duvall.

Current positions and written works

Plekhanov holds the current positions:

 Associate Professor at the Department of Political Science, York University
 Coordinator of the Post-Communist Studies Program at York Centre for International and Security Studies (York University)
 Director, South and Central Asia Project, York University
 Senior Associate of the Centre for Russian and East European Studies, University of Toronto
 Secretary, Canadian Pugwash Group

His published works include:

 "Russia and the West: Integration and Tensions" in: J.L.Black and Michael Johns (ed.) Russia after 2012: From Putin to Medvedev to  Putin: continuity, change, or revolution? New York: Routledge, 2013
 “Russia – A Resurgent Power?”, in: J.L. Black and Michael Johns (ed.) From Putin to Medvedev: Continuity or Change? Manotick: Penumbra Press, 2009
 “Communist Party of the Russian Federation”, in: Bruce Adams, Edward Lazzerini and George Rhyne (eds.). The Supplement to the Modern Encyclopedia of Russian and Soviet History, Vol.5, Academic International Press, 2005
 “Organized Crime, Business, and the Russian State”, in: Felia Allum, Renate Siebert (ed.) Organized Crime and the Challenge to Democracy. Routledge, 2003
 “Market Geopolitics: Continuity and Change in Russian Foreign Policy”, in: Lenard Cohen, Brian Job, Alexander Moens (eds.) Foreign Policy Realignment in the Age of Terror. Toronto: The Canadian Institute of Strategic Studies, 2003
 “Civil-Military Relations in Post-Soviet Russia: Rebuilding the “Battle Order”?” (with David Betz), in: Natalie Mychajlyszyn, Harald von Riekhoff (ed.) The Evolution of Civil-Military Relations in East-Central Europe and the Former Soviet Union. Westport: Greenwood Publishing Group, 2003
 “The Politics of ‘Mimicry’: The Case of Eastern Europe" (with Piotr Dutkiewicz), in: Albert Legault and Joel Sokolsky (ed.). The Soldier and the State in the Post Cold War Era. Kingston: Royal Military College of Canada, 2002
 Co-editor, with Harvey Simmons: Is Fascism History? Selected papers presented at the conference held at York University 28–29 October 1999. Toronto: Centre for International and Security Studies, York University, 2001
 "NATO Enlargement As An Issue in Russian Politics", in: Jacques Levesque (ed.) The Future of NATO: Enlargement, Russia, and European Security. Toronto: McGill-Queens University Press, 1999
 Co-author and co-editor, with John Logue and John Simmons: Transforming Russian Enterprises: From State Control to Worker Ownership. Westport: Greenwood Publishing Group, 1995
 Co-author and co-editor, with John Logue and John Simmons: Preobrazovanie predprijatij. Amerikanskij opyt i rossijskaja dejstvitel'nost' ( "Enterprise Reform: The American Experience and the Russian Reality") - a revised and updated Russian edition of the above. Moskva, Veche-Persej, 1997)
 "Soviet Perceptions of Long-Term Western Developments, Goals and Constraints", in: Klaus Gottstein (ed.) Mutual Perceptions of Long-Term Goals. Can the United States and the Soviet Union Cooperate Permanently? Campus Verlag - Westview Press, 1991
 "Pravyj ekstremism i vneshnyaya politika SShA" ("Right-Wing Extremism and US Foreign Policy"). Moscow: Nauka, 1987
 “Political Consciousness of Right Radicalism”, in: Eduard Batalov and Yuri Zamoshkin (ed.). Political Consciousness in the USA: Traditions and Modernity. Revised and expanded edition. Moscow: Progress Publishers, 1984

References

External links

Peace Magazine Interview, 2001

1946 births
Living people
Russian emigrants to Canada
Writers from Moscow
Russian expatriates in Canada
Soviet non-fiction writers
Soviet male writers
20th-century male writers
Russian political scientists
Russian political writers
Full Members of the Russian Academy of Sciences
Russian international relations scholars
University of California, Irvine faculty
Academic staff of the University of Toronto
Academic staff of York University
Moscow State Institute of International Relations alumni
Male non-fiction writers